The PBS Kids Bookworm Bunch was a preschool television block produced by Canada-based animation studio Nelvana Limited (now Nelvana Enterprises) that aired on PBS from September 30, 2000 to September 5, 2004. It typically aired on weekend mornings, depending on station preference and scheduling. The shows that formed the Bookworm Bunch were all based on children's books: Corduroy (by Don Freeman), Elliot Moose (by Andrea Beck), Timothy Goes to School (by Rosemary Wells), Seven Little Monsters (by Maurice Sendak), George Shrinks (by William Joyce), and Marvin the Tap-Dancing Horse (by Betty and Michael Paraskevas).

History
In August 1999, PBS and Nelvana teamed up to create the network's first-ever animated weekend programming block. It was created to boost viewership of the preschool audience on weekends, specifically on Saturday mornings when that attention was shifted elsewhere; many PBS stations devoted their Saturday morning schedules to general audience programming, including crafting or do-it-yourself shows, meanwhile commercial networks had extensive lineups for Saturday morning cartoons. A proposed series called Junior Kroll and Company was part of original plans for the new block, but that idea was eventually shelved and replaced by Marvin. This and the other five series were all based on a children's book, a theme that was inspired by a PBS-commissioned study from the University of Kansas that demonstrated the idea that children can learn to read from television programs. Upon its launch on September 30, 2000, the Bookworm Bunch became the second preschool-oriented Saturday morning block on broadcast television after Nick Jr. on CBS, which premiered two weeks before. Although PBS intended on the block to be broadcast on Saturdays, some stations opted to air it other days, particularly Sundays when there was less competition from other networks.

During the block's first season, all the shows (with the exception of the first 15-minute Corduroy episode), were shown either 15 or 45 minutes past the hour, in an effort to discourage "channel-flipping" to other competing children's cartoons. Another 15-minute Corduroy episode then ended the block, making its total run three hours. The Bookworm Bunch proved to be extremely popular in its first season, and weekend viewership increased dramatically. The first season ended on February 24, 2001, with reruns continuing until October 27, 2001 (including reruns of Corduroy and Elliot Moose).

The second and final season premiered on November 3, 2001, and with this premiere came a drastic revamp. Elliot Moose and Corduroy were both removed from the lineup entirely, thus shortening it to two hours. The four remaining series were instead seen on the hour and half-hour. Timothy and Marvin both ended production by late 2001. The second season ended on February 23, 2002, and reruns (from the second season) lasted on PBS stations until September 4, 2004.

Following the second season of the block, two shows were picked up as separate, standalone series. This included new episodes of Seven Little Monsters and George Shrinks beginning January 6, 2003, in addition to a brand-new revival of The Berenstain Bears. The new episodes of Seven Little Monsters were 15 minutes, instead of the original 30 minutes, and were aired immediately after The Berenstain Bears in the same half-hour timeslot. This did not last long as PBS eventually aired two 15-minute episodes of The Berenstain Bears back-to-back beginning September 15, 2003. George Shrinks was given its own half-hour timeslot, in which it also proved to be extremely popular. Given the success of these shows, many PBS stations carried them on their weekday schedule. 

As for the formal two-hour Bookworm Bunch block on weekends, the second season continued in reruns on select PBS stations and the PBS Kids Channel until September 5, 2004 when it was dropped altogether. Around this time, there were many new additions coming to the PBS weekend lineup (like Thomas & Friends and Bob the Builder) and the new PBS Kids Go! block debuted in 2004, all of which effectively replaced the Bookworm Bunch. Meanwhile, many PBS stations continued airing reruns of the individual standalone series (Monsters until the end of 2004, George Shrinks until 2009, and Bears which continues to air reruns on a limited number of stations as of 2023).

After the Bookworm Bunch block was dropped, cable channel Discovery Kids aired reruns of Timothy from 2004 until 2006, the now-defunct Qubo also aired reruns of Elliot, Timothy, and Marvin as part of its daily programming, the now-defunct Canadian dub of BBC Kids (Canadian TV channel) aired reruns of George Shrinks until it's closure on December 21, 2018, PBS Kids Sprout aired reruns of Monsters until July 2006 and the UK channel Tiny Pop aired reruns of Timothy until 2017.

Interstitials
Music video interstitials aired at the end of each program before the credits. These music videos were essentially montages of scenes from all of the shows with musical accompaniment. Each of the songs was performed by American musical artist Nancy Cassidy, appearing on three albums released between 1986 and 1992.

Season 1 (2000–2001)
 Corduroy (first half) – "Boom, Boom, Ain't It Great to Be Crazy" (shortened version) (Appears on the 1988 album KidsSongs 2)
 Elliot Moose – "You Gotta Sing" (Appears on the 1986 album KidsSongs)
 Timothy Goes to School – "Rig a Jig Jig" (Appears on KidsSongs 2)
 Seven Little Monsters – "La Bamba" (shortened version; Appears on KidsSongs 2)
 George Shrinks – "You Gotta Sing" (reprise)
 Marvin the Tap-Dancing Horse – "Rig a Jig Jig" (reprise)
 Corduroy (second half) – "Skidamarink" (Appears on the 1992 album KidsSongs: Sleepyheads)

Season 2 (2001–2002)
 Timothy Goes to School – "Friends Are Special" (Appears on KidsSongs: Sleepyheads)
 Marvin the Tap-Dancing Horse – "La Bamba" (extended version)
 Seven Little Monsters – "This Little Light of Mine" (Appears on KidsSongs)
 George Shrinks – "Boom, Boom, Ain't It Great to Be Crazy" (extended version)

Programming

Former programming

Original programming
The first season (2000-2001) of the Bookworm Bunch block ran for three hours, and the second season (2001-2002) ran for two hours.

Standalone programming
The most successful series from the weekend Bookworm Bunch block were stripped to five days a week, and joined Berenstain Bears as standalone programs.

References

External links
 

PBS original programming
PBS Kids shows
Television programming blocks in the United States